The 1950–51 season was the 58th season in Liverpool F.C.'s existence, and ended with the club finishing ninth in the table.

Goalkeepers

 Charlie Ashcroft
 Russell Crossley
 Cyril Sidlow

Defenders

 Joe Cadden
 John Heydon
 Laurie Hughes
 Bill Jones
 Ray Lambert
 Bob Paisley
 Bill Shepherd
 Eddie Spicer
 Phil Taylor

Midfielders

 Ken Brierley
 Billy Liddell
 Jimmy Payne
 Bryan Williams
 Don Woan

Forwards

 Jack Balmer
 Kevin Baron
 Cyril Done
 Willie Fagan
 Jack Haigh
 Albert Stubbins

Table

Results

First Division

FA Cup

References
 LFC History.net – 1950–51 season
 Liverweb - 1950–51 Season

Liverpool F.C. seasons
Liverpool